Sydney Andrew Coventry (13 June 1899 – 10 November 1976) was an Australian rules footballer.

Family
He married Gladys Eileen Trevaskis (1901–1977) on 8 October 1921.

West Coast of Tasmania
Originally from Diamond Creek, Victoria, Coventry journeyed across the Bass Strait after the First World War to work in the mines at Queenstown, Tasmania, taking with him a reputation as a fine footballer.  

Coventry first played for a Queenstown based team in 1919, but was appointed Captain of the Miners team from Gormanston for the 1920 season. The team played in the Queenstown based ‘Lyell Miners Football Association’ which included 9 teams. Gormanston was a small miners town at the top of Mount Lyell. The footballers in the region are noted as some of the hardiest in Australia given the weather and playing conditions, which include the famous Gravel Oval at Queenstown.

St Kilda
While still in Queenstown, Coventry was approached by St Kilda, who wanted him to play for them in 1921. But he was still on the radar of a handful of VFL clubs, and signed to play with St Kilda when he came back to Melbourne.

Collingwood
Syd duly agreed, but when he returned to Melbourne he was persuaded by his younger brother Gordon Coventry, who had just finished his first season with Collingwood, to reconsider. Apart from the issue of family loyalty, there was the small matter of the excessive distance between Diamond Creek and St Kilda to think of.

The upshot of it all was that Syd Coventry elected to throw in his lot with Collingwood, whereupon St Kilda, not surprisingly, screamed "foul!" The VFL Permits Committee was called in to adjudicate, and Coventry was faced with the choice of playing with St Kilda, or sitting out of football for twelve months so that he could join the Woods. He opted for the latter course of action.

In his first season at Collingwood in the 1922 VFL season he played 18 games including that year’s 1922 VFL Grand Final kicking 2 goals in this match.

Despite standing only 180 cm in height, Syd Coventry played mainly as a ruckman, where his aggression, vigour and dynamism more than compensated for any deficiency in stature. A born leader, he captained the Magpies from 1927 until he moved to Footscray as coach at the end of the 1934 season. He thus enjoyed the unique privilege of captaining four successive VFL premiership teams.

Often at his best when the going was rough, one of Syd Coventry's finest performances came on a waterlogged MCG in the 1927 grand final, when Collingwood and Richmond between them could manage only 3 goals for the match. The 1927 season also saw him win both the Brownlow Medal and Collingwood's best and fairest award. He repeated the second achievement five years later.

Coventry till this day remains the only Premiership Captain to win a Brownlow in the same year. For good measure, he was named the best player in that year's Grand Final.

As a Captain, Syd led Collingwood Football Club in 149 games. In that period, Collingwood won 115 games, drew twice and lost 32 times. Additionally, the team had a winning ratio of 77 percent, a VFL/AFL record for many years, but it has since beaten by Tom Harley, who had a 49–7 win–loss record as captain of Geelong in 2007–2009, a winning ratio of 87.5 percent. 

Virtual omnipresent in VFL representative teams for most of his career, Coventry made a total of 27 interstate appearances. His eventual departure from Victoria Park to coach Footscray came with the blessing of the Collingwood committee—but only on the proviso that he did not continue as a player.

Footscray
After two unsuccessful and unhappy years with Footscray (1934–1935), Syd Coventry returned to Collingwood in an administrative capacity.

Collingwood committeeman
He served as club vice-president from 1939 to 1949, and as president between 1950 and 1962. From 1963 until 1976 he was Collingwood's patron, rounding off more than fifty years of involvement with the club.

In 1969, the Collingwood Football Club named the newly built social club stand at Victoria Park S.A Coventry Pavilion.

In 1992, the Melbourne Cricket Club named Gate 7 after Coventry (& his brother) as part of the Great Southern Stand development at the MCG.

In 1996, Coventry was inducted into the first batch of players and officials in the Australian Football Hall of Fame.

Two of Syd's sons played for Collingwood: Hugh Coventry played for a year before enlisting in the RAAF and was awarded with a Distinguished Flying Cross; another son, Syd Coventry, Jr., also played for the club.

In 2016, Coventry was named by Sam Walker of The Wall Street Journal as one of the 16 best captain’s in sport history.

See also
 1927 Melbourne Carnival

 1930  Adelaide Carnival

 1933 Sydney Carnival

Footnotes 

1899 births
1976 deaths
Australian rules footballers from Melbourne
Australian Rules footballers: place kick exponents
Collingwood Football Club players
Collingwood Football Club Premiership players
Copeland Trophy winners
Australian Football Hall of Fame inductees
Western Bulldogs coaches
Brownlow Medal winners

Four-time VFL/AFL Premiership players
People from Diamond Creek, Victoria
Collingwood Football Club administrators